Isabela Island may refer to:

Isabela Island (Galápagos)
Isabela Island (Philippines)

See also
Isabel Island (disambiguation)